Jean-Louis Lemoyne (1665–1755) was a French sculptor whose works were commissioned by Louis XIV and Louis XV.

His sculptures are featured in major art museums, including the Louvre, the Metropolitan Museum of Art, the Frick Collection, the Museum of Fine Arts, and the National Gallery of Art.  Lemoyne was the pupil of Antoine Coysevox.

His son Jean-Baptiste Lemoyne was also a noted sculptor.

Works
 La Crainte des Traits de l'Amour - Metropolitan Museum of Art
 A Companion of Diana - National Gallery of Art
 
Jacques-Rolland Moreau, 1712, Museum of Fine Arts, Boston

1665 births
1755 deaths
17th-century French sculptors
French male sculptors
18th-century French sculptors
Artists from Paris
18th-century French male artists